Spring Creek Dam is a minor embankment dam across the Spring Creek upstream of Orange in the central western region of New South Wales, Australia. The impounded reservoir is called the Spring Creek Reservoir.

Location and features
Additional dams for water supply were completed in 1918 at Meadow Creek Dam and the Gosling Creek Dam in 1890. Since the construction of Suma Park Dam, completed in 1962, Spring Creek Dam has served as the secondary water supply for the city.

At 100% capacity the dam wall holds back  of water. The spillway is capable of discharging .

Recently Orange City Council has strengthened the dam wall.  Kinross Wolaroi School also uses the dam for the sport of rowing.

See also

 List of dams and reservoirs in New South Wales

Gallery

References

External links
 
 

Central West (New South Wales)
Water management in New South Wales
Embankment dams
Dams completed in 1931
Dams in New South Wales